George H. Trilling (18 September 1930 – 30 April 2020) was a Polish-born American particle physicist.
He was co-discoverer of the J/ψ meson which confirmed the existence of the charm quark. Trilling joined the Physics Department faculty at the University of California, Berkeley, in 1960, where he was Department Chair from 1968 through 1972. Trilling was on sabbatical leave to CERN in 1973–74, where he worked on the study of the properties of charm particles, their decay modes and excited states. He was also Director of the Physics Division at the Lawrence Berkeley National Laboratory from 1984 until 1987.
Trilling was a principal proponent of the Superconducting Super Collider project and spokesperson for the Solenoidal Detector Collaboration.
After the SSC was cancelled in 1993, Trilling transitioned most of the SDC team to collaborate
on the
ATLAS experiment at the LHC, which led to the discovery of the Higgs boson in 2012.
Trilling was elected Vice-President of the American Physical Society, beginning his term on 1 January 1999, and was President of the society in 2001.

Early life and education 
George was born in Bialystok, Poland, and his family emigrated to France a few months later,
where they lived primarily in Nice.
In 1940, World War II forced the family to emigrate again, eventually settling in Pasadena, California.
He earned his B.S. in electrical engineering in 1951, and his Ph.D. in physics in 1955, both from Caltech. He did one year of postdoctoral studies at Caltech and then studied in France on a Fulbright Fellowship with Louis Leprince-Ringuet.

Career 
In 1957, Trilling joined the physics faculty at the University of Michigan, where he was a member of the group headed by Professor Donald A. Glaser. In 1959, Glaser moved to University of California, Berkeley, and recruited Trilling to join him there as a tenured associate professor in 1960. When Glaser changed his research focus to biophysics in 1962, Trilling assumed leadership of the group. In 1963, Trilling joined forces with Gerson Goldhaber to form the Trilling-Goldhaber Group. Trilling was Chair of the Physics Department at Berkeley from 1968 to 1972, and Director of the LBNL Physics Division from 1984 to 1987. He was a Fellow of the American Physical Society, served as its President in 2001, and elected to the National Academy of Sciences in 1983  and the American Academy of Arts and Sciences in 1993.

Fields of study 
Trilling's research focuses on the study of high-energy interactions with electron-positron or proton-proton colliders. His work is a US collaboration using the Large Hadron Collider from the European Laboratory for Particle Physics known as CERN.

References 

1930 births
2020 deaths
American physicists
American people of Polish descent
People associated with CERN
University of Michigan faculty
Presidents of the American Physical Society